No Regrets, also translated Stubborn and Regretless and Never Deplore, is the translated title of a 1993 Cantonese album recorded by Chinese Cantopop singer Faye Wong when she was based in Hong Kong. The title track was released in both Cantonese and Mandarin.

By the time of the album's release, Wong was already established a substantial fanbase in Hong Kong. She wrote the Mandarin lyrics for the ballad "No Regrets", released as a hit single.  The similarly titled album was released in February 1993 and became an instant best-seller. Although the songs were mostly soft contemporary arrangements, a popular style in Hong Kong, it also had a few dance songs and two versions of the title track: Wong's Mandarin song, and the other with Cantonese lyrics by Chen Shao Qi (the Mandarin version is by far the more popular one).

Track listing
紅粉菲菲 (Hung Fan Fei Fei) - Faye's Rouge
執迷不悔 (Zhi Mi Bu Hui) - No Regrets/Stubborn and Regretless (Mandarin version)
可愛眼睛 (Ho Oi Ngaan Zing) - Charming Eyes
季候風 (Gwai Hau Fung) - Monsoon
不再兒嬉 (Bat Zoi Ji Hei) - No More Games
我永遠珍惜你我 (Ngo Wing Jyun Zan Sik Nei Ngo) - I will Always Cherish You
情敵 (Cing Dik) - Rival
從明日開始 (Cung Ming Jat Hoi Ci) - We'll Begin Tomorrow
夜半醉 (Je Bun Zeoi) - Half-boozed Night
執迷不悔 (Zap Mai Bat Fui) - No Regrets

References

1993 albums
Faye Wong albums
Cinepoly Records albums
Cantopop albums